Richard King  was an English lawyer and politician who sat in the House of Commons  between 1640 and 1643. He supported the Royalist side in the English Civil War.

King was elected recorder of Melcombe Regis on 4 February 1628.

In April 1640, King was elected Member of Parliament for Melcombe Regis in the Short Parliament. He was re-elected MP for Melcombe Regis in the Long Parliament in November 1640  King is recorded in an incident in 1641 after George Digby was accelerated to the House of Lords. Digby's younger brother John perched himself on a ladder at the door of the chamber which the speaker, William Lenthall  took as an act of disrespect and insubordination and told him to take his place, and not to sit upon the  ladder as if he were going to be hanged. King complained that the Speaker had   transgressed his duty in using so disgraceful a speech to so noble a gentleman and after some turmoil obtained a conditional apology. King supported King Charles and was disabled from sitting in parliament on 27 February 1643.  
 
King died between 1643 and 1645.

References

Year of birth missing
Year of death missing
English MPs 1640 (April)
English MPs 1640–1648
Members of the Parliament of England (pre-1707) for Weymouth and Melcombe Regis
Recorder (judge)
1640s deaths
17th-century English judges